Dallas County is a county located in the U.S. state of Arkansas. As of the 2020 census, the population was 6,482, making it the fourth-least populous county in Arkansas. The county seat is Fordyce. Dallas County is Arkansas's 49th county, formed on January 1, 1845; it was named for George M. Dallas, 11th Vice President of the United States.

Geography

Major highways
 U.S. Highway 79
 U.S. Highway 167
 Highway 7
 Highway 8
 Highway 9
 Highway 46
 Highway 48

Adjacent counties
 Grant County (northeast)
 Cleveland County (east)
 Calhoun County (southeast)
 Ouachita County (southwest)
 Clark County (west)
 Hot Spring County (northwest)

Demographics

2020 census

As of the 2020 United States census, there were 6,482 people, 2,969 households, and 1,797 families residing in the county.

2000 census
As of the 2000 census, there were 9,210 people, 3,519 households, and 2,431 families residing in the county.  The population density was 14 people per square mile (5/km2).  There were 4,401 housing units at an average density of 7 per square mile (3/km2).  The racial makeup of the county was 56.96% White, 40.98% Black or African American, 0.24% Native American, 0.23% Asian, 1.01% from other races, and 0.59% from two or more races.  1.92% of the population were Hispanic or Latino of any race.

There were 3,519 households, out of which 29.60% had children under the age of 18 living with them, 51.00% were married couples living together, 13.80% had a female householder with no husband present, and 30.90% were non-families. 28.30% of all households were made up of individuals, and 13.90% had someone living alone who was 65 years of age or older.  The average household size was 2.48 and the average family size was 3.03.

In the county, the population was spread out, with 26.20% under the age of 18, 8.30% from 18 to 24, 24.50% from 25 to 44, 24.10% from 45 to 64, and 17.00% who were 65 years of age or older.  The median age was 38 years. For every 100 females there were 94.30 males.  For every 100 females age 18 and over, there were 91.90 males.

The median income for a household in the county was $26,608, and the median income for a family was $32,630. Males had a median income of $28,538 versus $17,884 for females. The per capita income for the county was $14,610.  About 13.30% of families and 18.90% of the population were below the poverty line, including 23.80% of those under age 18 and 20.00% of those age 65 or over.

Government
Prior to 2004, this county was considered an "ancestral" Democratic county, where Democrats won every presidential race with exceptions for the 1968 campaign of George Wallace and the 1972 and 1984 landslides of Richard Nixon and Ronald Reagan, respectively. Former Governor Bill Clinton won this county twice in his presidential runs: 1992 and 1996. Al Gore won this county in 2000, the most recent Democrat to do so.

Communities

Cities
 Carthage
 Fordyce (county seat)
 Sparkman

Townships

 Bunn
 Chester (Carthage)
 Dry Run (part of Fordyce)
 Fordyce (most of Fordyce)
 Holly Springs
 Jackson
 Liberty
 Manchester
 Manning
 Nix
 Owen (Sparkman)
 Princeton
 Smith
 Southall
 Willow

See also
 National Register of Historic Places listings in Dallas County, Arkansas

References

 
1845 establishments in Arkansas
Populated places established in 1845